The women's 10,000 metres event at the 2015 African Games was held on 16 September.

Results

References

10000
2015 in women's athletics